Faisal Agab Sido  (born 24 August 1978)  is a Sudanese football player who plays as an attacking midfielder and striker for Sudan national team and the Sudanese club Al-Merreikh. He is also the captain of Al-Merreikh club.

He is the all-time leading Sudanese scorer in African championships with 21goals and Arabian championships with 7 goals. Agab is the top scorer of the Sudanese league with 119 goals total since the first on 1998 in alhassahissa against alnile (3/0) 111 with almerikh and 8 with merikh alfasher .

he scored 4 goals for almerikh in cecafa cup.

he wears the number 24 in Al Merrikh and number 17 in the Nile Crocodiles Sudan national team.

Honours

Clubs
Al-Merrikh SC
Sudan Premier League
Champions (6):2000,2001,2002,2008,2011,2013
Sudan Cup
Winners (8):2001,2005,2006,2007,2008,2010,2012,2013

External links
 Official website 
 

Living people
Sudanese footballers
Sudan international footballers
2008 Africa Cup of Nations players
2012 Africa Cup of Nations players
Association football midfielders
1978 births
Al-Merrikh SC players
People from Khartoum North
Sudan Premier League players